Lightweight Portable Security (LPS) was a Linux LiveCD (or LiveUSB) distribution, developed and publicly distributed by the United States Department of Defense’s Air Force Research Laboratory, that is designed to serve as a secure end node. The Air Force Research Laboratory actively maintained LPS and its successor, Trusted End Node Security (TENS) from 2007 to 2021. It can run on almost any x86_64 computer (PC or Mac). LPS boots only in RAM, creating a pristine, non-persistent end node. It supports DoD-approved Common Access Card (CAC) readers, as required for authenticating users into PKI-authenticated gateways to access internal DoD networks.

LPS turns an untrusted system (such as a home computer) into a trusted network client. No trace of work activity (or malware) can be written to the local computer's hard drive. As of September 2011 (version 1.2.5), the LPS public distribution includes a smart card-enabled Firefox browser supporting DoD's CAC and Personal Identity Verification (PIV) cards, a PDF and text viewer, Java, a file browser, remote desktop software (Citrix, Microsoft or VMware View), an SSH client, the public edition of Encryption Wizard and the ability to use USB flash drives. A Public Deluxe version is also available that adds LibreOffice and Adobe Reader software.

History 
LPS and Encryption Wizard were initiated by the Air Force Research Laboratory's Anti-Tamper Software Protection Initiative program, started in 2001. In 2016, that program was ending, so LPS and Encryption Wizard were moved to the Trusted End Node Security program office. LPS, as of version 1.7 was rebranded Trusted End Node Security, or TENS. Encryption Wizard retained its name, but received the TENS logo as of version 3.4.11.

In 2020, the COVID-19 pandemic led to an increase in remote work. The National Security Agency recommended that U.S. government employees working remotely use government furnished computers. However, when it was necessary for an employee to use their home computer, the National Security Agency recommended TENS as one measure an individual employee could use to make that computer more secure.

In 2021, TENS became compatible with UEFI Secure Boot. UEFI Secure Boot is used to protect the operating system installed on the computer's hard drive. As of June 2020, UEFI Secure Boot was available on many newer PCs. UEFI Secure Boot would prevent older versions of TENS from booting.

In August 2021, the TENS web site announced the TENS program office had been decommissioned. The Defense Information Systems Agency was no longer willing to fund the program. No other agency had agreed to champion the program. "Potentially final" editions of TENS and Encryption Wizard had been released in April and May 2021.

Encryption Wizard 
LPS came with Encryption Wizard (EW), a simple, strong file and folder encryptor for protection of sensitive but unclassified information (FOUO, Privacy Act, CUI, etc.). Written in Java, EW encrypted all file types for data at rest and data in transit protection. Without installation or elevated privileges, EW ran on Windows, Mac, Linux, Solaris, and other computers that support the Java software platform. With a simple drag and drop interface, EW offered 128-bit and 256-bit AES encryption, SHA-256 hashing, RSA signatures, searchable metadata, archives, compression, secure deleting, and PKI/CAC/PIV support. Encryption could be keyed from a passphrase or a PKI certificate. EW was GOTS—U.S. Government invented, owned, and supported software—and came in three versions, a public version that uses the standard Java cryptographic library, a unified version that uses a FIP-140-2 certified crypto licensed by The Legion of the Bouncy Castle, and a government-only version that uses a FIPS-140-2 certified crypto stack licensed from RSA Security. The three versions interoperate.

Public HTTPS access 
The general public has had some difficulty accessing the LPS and TENS web sites, because from time to time, Department of Defense web sites have used security settings somewhat different than common practice. As a result, users have to configure their web browsers a particular way in order to obtain LPS or TENS. Circa 2020, the main difference is the web sites implement HTTPS using a Department of Defense certificate authority rather than one of the commonly accepted certificate authorities.

Because of these difficulties with the Department of Defense web servers, the LPS and TENS program office established a commercially hosted web site http://www.gettens.online/ with instructions how to configure a browser to work with the official TENS web site.

This article incorporates text from the US Department of Defense SPI web site.

See also
XFCE
Lightweight Linux distribution

References
References to the Trusted End Node Security Program office refer to the Trusted End Node Security Program Office, Information Directorate, Air Force Research Laboratories, United States Air Force. 

References to the Software Protection Initiative refer to the DoD Anti-Tamper Program, Sensors Directorate, Air Force Research Laboratories, United States Air Force.

External links 
 . Home page for the TENS Program office.

Operating system security
Operating system distributions bootable from read-only media
Live USB
State-sponsored Linux distributions
Linux distributions